William Handley may refer to:
 William Anderson Handley, U.S. Representative from Alabama
 William Farnworth Handley, British member of parliament
 William Sampson Handley, English surgeon